The following is a list of villages in Hong Kong.

Villages in the New Territories
Non-indigenous villages are italicised. Composite villages are bolded.

Each village has one resident representative and at least one indigenous inhabitant representative. Villages with more than one indigenous inhabitant representatives are marked.

North District

Fanling District Rural Committee
粉嶺區鄉事委員會

Fan Leng Lau (2)
Fanling Wai
Fanling Ching Wai
Fanling Pak Wai
Fanling Nam Wai
Hok Tau Wai
Ling Shan Tsuen
Lo Wai
Ma Wat Wai
Ma Wat Tsuen
Pak Fuk Tsuen
Shung Him Tong Tsuen
Tin Sam Tsuen
Tong Hang
Tong Hang Village
Tsz Tong Tsuen
Tung Kok Wai
Wing Ning Wai
Wing Ning Village
Wo Hop Shek San Tsuen
Wo Hing Tsuen

Sha Tau Kok District Rural Committee
沙頭角區鄉事委員會

 A Ma Wat
 Ap Chau
 Au Ha
Fung Hang
Ha Wo Hang
Kai Kuk Shue Ha and Ham Hang Mei
Kap Tong
Kat O
Kau Tam Tso
Kong Ha
Kuk Po (2)
Lai Chi Wo
Lai Tau Shek
Lin Ma Hang
Loi Tung
Luk Keng Chan Uk

Luk Keng Wong Uk
Ma Tseuk Leng Ha
Ma Tseuk Leng Sheung
Man Uk Pin
Miu Tin
Mui Tsz Lam
Muk Min Tau and Tsiu Hang
Nam Chung
Ngau Shi Wu
Sai Lau Kong
Sam A
San Tsuen
Sha Tau Kok Market (East) (沙頭角墟(東))
Sha Tau Kok Market (West Lower)
Sha Tau Kok Market (West Upper)

Shan Tsui
Shek Chung Au
Shek Kiu Tau
Sheung Wo Hang
So Lo Pun
Tai Long
Tai Tong Wu
Tam Shui Hang
Tong To
Tsat Muk Kiu
Wang Shan Keuk
Wu Kau Tang
Wu Shek Kok
Yim Tso Ha and Pok Tau Ha
Yung Shue Au

Sheung Shui District Rural Committee
上水區鄉事委員會

Cheung Lek
Hang Tau (2)
Ho Sheung Heung
Kai Leung
Kam Tsin (2)
Kwu Tung (North)
Kwu Tung (South)

Lin Tong Mei
Liu Pok
Ma Tso Lung (North)
Ma Tso Lung (South)
Ng Uk Tsuen
Ping Kong
Sheung Shui Heung (3)

Tai Tau Leng (2)
Tong Kung Leng
Tsiu Keng
Tsung Pak Long
Wa Shan Tsuen
Yin Kong
Ying Pun

Ta Kwu Ling District Rural Committee
打鼓嶺區鄉事委員會

Chow Tin Tsuen (2)
Chuk Yuen
Fung Wong Wu
Ha Shan Kai Wat
Heung Yuen Wai
Kan Tau Wai
Lei Uk

Lo Wu
Muk Wu
Nga Yiu
Nga Yiu Ha
Ping Che
Ping Yeung (4)
San Uk Ling

 Sheung Shan Kai Wut
Tai Po Tin
Tak Yuet Lau
Tong Fong
Tsung Yuen Ha
Wo Keng Shan

Villages within the Frontier Closed Area
The following villages are located in Frontier Closed Area and can only be visited with a Frontier Closed Area Permit:

Lo Wu(including Yuen Leng Chai
Sha Tau Kok Market (East) (沙頭角墟(東))
Sha Tau Kok Market (West Lower)
Sha Tau Kok Market (West Upper)
San Kwai Tin / King To
Lin Ma Hang(if visiting via Lin Ma Hang Road)
Parts of Shan Tsui
Kong Ha
Yuen Tun Shan
Choi Yuen Kok

Visiting the following villages through Starling Inlet requires a Frontier Closed Area Permit:
Fung Hang
Kuk Po

Visiting the following villages through Sha Tau Kok Pier requires a Frontier Closed Area Permit:
Ap Chau
Kap Tong
Kat O
Lai Chi Wo
Lei Pik Shek
Mui Tsz Lam
Ngau Shi Wu
Sam A
Sai Lau Kong
So Lo Pun
Yung Shue Au

Tai Po District

Sai Kung North Rural Committee
西貢北約鄉事委員會

 Che Ha
 Chek Keng
 Cheung Muk Tau
 Cheung Sheung
 Ha Yeung
 Hoi Ha
 Kei Ling Ha Lo Wai
 Kei Ling Ha San Wai
 Ko Lau Wan
 Ko Tong
 Kwun Hang
 Lai Chi Chong
 Ma Kwu Lam

 Nai Chung
 Nam Shan Tung
 Nga Iu Tau Tsun
 Ngong Ping
 Pak Sha O
 Pak Tam Au
 Ping Chau Chau Mei
 Ping Chau Chau Tau
 Ping Chau Nai Tau
 Ping Chau Sha Tau
 Ping Chau Tai Tong
 Sai Keng
 Sai O

 Sham Chung
 Tai Tan
 Tai Tung
 Tan Ka Wan
 Tap Mun
 Tap Mun Fishermen Village
 Tin Liu
 To Kwa Peng
 Tseng Tau
 Tung Sam Kei
 Uk Tau
 Wong Chuk Yeung
 Yung Shu O

Tai Po Rural Committee
[大埔鄉事委員會] 

 A Shan
 Chai Kek
 Cheung Shue Tan
 Cheung Uk Tei
 Chung Mei San Tsuen
 Chung Pui San Tsuen
 Chung Uk Tsuen
 Fong Ma Po
 Fung Yuen
 Ha Hang
 Ha Tei Ha
 Ha Wong Yi Au
 Ha Wun Yiu
 Hang Ha Po
 Kam Chuk Pai San Tsuen
 Kam Shan Village
 Kau Liu Ha
 Kau Lung Hang
 Lai Chi Shan
 Lin Au, Cheng Uk
 Lin Au, Lei Uk
 Lo Tsz Tin
 Luen Yick Fishermen Village
 Lung A Pei
 Lung Mei
 Ma Po Mei
 Ma Wo Tsuen
 Mui Shue Hang
 Nam Hang
 Nam Wa Po

 Ng Tung Chai
 Pak Ngau Shek Ha Tsuen
 Pak Ngau Shek Sheung Tsuen
 Pan Chung
 Pan Chung San Tsuen
 Ping Long
 Ping Shan Chai
 Po Sam Pai
 Pun Shan Chau
 Sam Mun Tsai
 San Tau Kok
 San Tong
 San Tsuen (Lam Tsuen)
 San Uk Ka
 San Uk Tsai
 San Wai Tsai
 Sha Lo Tung Cheung Uk
 Sha Lo Tung Lei Uk
 Shan Liu
 She Shan
 Shek Kwu Lung
 Sheung Wong Yi Au
 Sheung Wun Yiu
 Shuen Wan Chan Uk
 Shuen Wan Chim Uk
 Shuen Wan Lei Uk
 Shuen Wan Sha Lan
 Shuen Wan Wai Ha
 Shui Wo
 Siu Kau San Tsuen

 Siu Om Shan
 Ta Tit Yan
 Tai Hang
 Tai Kau San Tsuen
 Tai Mei Tuk
 Tai Mon Che
 Tai Om
 Tai Om Shan
 Tai Po Kau
 Tai Po Kau Hui
 Tai Po Mei
 Tai Po Tau
 Tai Po Tau Shui Wai
 Tai Wo
 Tin Liu Ha
 Ting Kok
 To Yuen Tung
 Tong Sheung Tsuen
 Tseng Tau
 Tung Tsz
 Wai Tau Tsuen
 Wan Tau Kok
 Wang Ling Tau San Tsuen
 Wong Yue Tan
 Yin Ngam
 Ying Pun Ha Chuk Hang
 Yue Kok
 Yuen Leng Lei Uk
 Yuen Leng Yip Uk
 Yuen Tun Ha

Sha Tin District

Sha Tin Rural Committee
沙田鄉事委員會. About 29,000 people live in 48 indigenous villages.

 Ah Kung Kok Fishermen Village
 Au Pui Wan
 Chap Wai Kon
 Chek Nai Ping
 Cheung Lek Mei
 Fo Tan
 Fu Yung Pei
 Fui Yiu Ha and Tse Uk
 Ha Keng Hau
 Ha Wo Che
 Hin Tin
 Ho Lek Pui
 Kak Tin
 Kau To
 Kwun Yam Shan and Kong Pui
 Lok Lo Ha

 Ma Liu
 Ma On Shan
 Mau Tat
 Mau Tso Ngam
 Mui Tsz Lam
 Ngau Pei Sha
 Pai Tau Village
 Pat Tsz Wo
 San Tin Village
 Sha Tin Tau and Lee Uk
 Sha Tin Wai
 Shan Ha Wai aka. Tsang Tai Uk
 Shan Mei
 Shap Yi Wat
 Shek Kwu Lung and Nam Shan
 Shek Lung Tsai

 Sheung Keng Hau
 Sheung Wo Che
 Siu Lek Yuen
 Tai Lam Liu
 Tai Shui Hang Village
 Tai Wai Village
 Tin Sum
 To Shek
 To Tau Wan
 Tsok Pok Hang
 Tung Lo Wan
 Wo Liu Hang
 Wong Chuk Yeung
 Wong Nai Tau Village, Tai Che and Fa Sham Hang
 Wong Uk
 Wu Kai Sha Village and Cheung Kang

Sai Kung District

Hang Hau Rural Committee
坑口鄉事委員會

Fu Tau Chau
Po Toi O
Shui Bin Tsuen

Sai Kung Rural Committee
西貢鄉事委員會

 Che Keng Tuk
 Hing Keng Shek
 Ho Chung
 Hoi Pong Street
 Kai Ham
 Kau Sai San Tsuen
 Long Keng
 Lung Mei
 Ma Nam Wat
 Main Street (East)
 Main Street (West)
 Man Wo
 Man Yee Wan New Village
 Mau Ping New Village
 Mok Tse Che
 Nam A
 Nam Shan
 Nam Wai
 Ngong Wo
 O Long
 O Tau
 Pak A
 Pak Kong
 Pak Kong Au
 Pak Lap
 Pak Sha Wan
 Pak Tam
 Pak Tam Chung
 Pak Wai
 Pik Uk
 Ping Tun
 Po Tung Road (East)
 Po Tung Road (West)
 Sai Kung Road (North)
 Sai Kung Road (South)
 Sai Wan
 See Cheung Street
 Sha Ha
 Sha Kok Mei
 Sha Tsui New Village
 Shan Liu
 She Tau
 Shek Hang
 Ta Ho Tun
 Tai Lam Wu
 Tai Long
 Tai Mong Tsai
 Tai No
 Tai Po Tsai
 Tai She Wan
 Tai Street (East)
 Tai Street (West)
 Tai Wan
 Tak Lung Back Street
 Tak Lung Front Street
 Tam Wat
 Tit Kim Hang
 Tsak Yue Wu
 Tsam Chuk Wan
 Tsiu Hang
 Tso Wo Hang
 Tui Min Hoi
 Tung A
 Uk Cheung
 Wo Liu
 Wo Mei
 Wong Chuk Shan New Village
 Wong Chuk Wan
 Wong Keng Tei
 Wong Keng Tsai
 Wong Mo Ying
 Wong Yi Chau
 Yim Tin Tsai

Yuen Long District

Lau Fau Shan Rural Committee
流浮山鄉事委員會

 Fung Ka Wai
 Choi Yuen
 Hang Hau Tsuen
 Mong Tseng Tsuen
 Mong Tseng Wai

 Nam Sha Po
 Ngau Hom
 Pak Nai
 San Hing Tsuen

 Sha Kong Tsuen
 Sha Kong Wai
 Tai Shui Hang
 Tin Shui Wai

Ha Tsuen Rural Committee
廈村鄉事委員會

 Fung Kong Tsuen
 Ha Tsuen San Wai
 Ha Tsuen Shi
 Hong Mei Tsuen
 Lei Uk Tsuen
 Lo Uk Tsuen

 San Lei Uk Tsuen
 San Sang Tsuen
 San Uk Tsuen
 Sik Kong Tsuen
 Sik Kong Wai
 Tin Sam Tsuen

 Tseung Kong Wai
 Tung Tau Tsuen
 Sha Chau Lei Tsuen
 Ha Pak Nai Tsuen

Kam Tin Rural Committee
錦田鄉事委員會

 Fung Kat Heung (逢吉鄉)
 Kam Tin San Tsuen
 Kam Tin Shi
 Kam Hing Wai

 Kat Hing Wai
 Ko Po Tsuen
 Sha Po Tsuen
 Shui Mei Tsuen

 Shui Tau Tsuen
 Tai Hong Wai
 Tsz Tong Tsuen
 Wing Lung Wai

Pat Heung Rural Committee
八鄉鄉事委員會

 Cheung Kong Tsuen
 Ng Ka Tsuen
 Pang Ka Tsuen
 Tai Kong Po Tsuen
 Tsat Sing Kong Tsuen
 A Kung Tin
 Cheung Po Tsuen
 Chuk Hang Tsuen
 Ha Che Tsuen
 Ho Pui Tsuen
 Kam Tsin Wai Tsuen
 Kap Lung Tsuen
 Lai Ka Tsz
 Leung Uk Tsuen

 Lin Fa Tei
 Wang Toi Shan Lo Uk Tsuen
 Ma On Kong Tsuen
 Ngau Keng Tsuen
 San Lung Wai
 Shek Kong Tsuen
 Shek Tau Wai
 Shek Wu Tong Tsuen
 Sheung Che Tsuen
 Sheung Tsuen
 Shui Lau Tin Tsuen
 Shui Tsan Tin Tsuen
 Ta Shek Wu Tsuen
 Tai Kek

 Tai Wo Tsuen
 Tin Sam Tsuen
 Wang Toi Shan
 Wang Toi Shan San Tsuen
 Wang Toi Shan Wing Ning Lei Tsuen
 Yau Uk Tsuen
 Yuen Kong Tsuen
 Yuen Kong San Tsuen
 Lui Kung Tin Tsuen
 Wang Toi Shan Ha San Uk Tsuen
 Wang Toi Shan Ho Lik Pui Tsuen
 Wang Toi Shan San Tsuen

Ping Shan Rural Committee
屏山鄉事委員會

 Shek Po Tsuen
 Tan Kwai Tsuen
 Chung Sam Wai (中心圍 or 忠心圍)
 Fuk Hing Tsuen
 Fui Sha Wai
 Fung Chi Tsuen
 Ha Mei San Tsuen
 Hang Mei Tsuen
 Hang Tau Tsuen
 Hung Uk Tsuen
 Hung Yun Tsuen
 Kiu Tau Wai

 Lam Hau Tsuen
 Lam Uk Tsuen
 Ng Uk Tsuen
 Ping Shan Tsai
 Pak Sha Tsai
 Sai Tau Wai
 Ping Shan San Tsuen
 Shan Ha Tsuen
 Sheung Cheung Wai
 Shing Uk Tsuen
 Shui Pin Tsuen
 Shui Pin Wai

 Tai Tsang Wai
 Tong Fong Tsuen
 Tung Tau Tsuen
 Wing Ning Tsuen
 Yeung Uk Tsuen
 Tong Yan San Tsuen
 Tai Tao Tsuen
 Tung Tau Wai
 Tung Tau Wai San Tsuen
 Ting Fook Villas
 Yuk Yat Garden
 Chung Hing San Tsuen

San Tin Rural Committee
新田鄉事委員會

 Chau Tau Tsuen (2)
 Fan Tin Tsuen
 Ha Chuk Yuen
 Ha San Wai
 Lok Ma Chau
 Ma Tso Lung San Tsuen
 Mai Po San Tsuen
 Mai Po Lo Wai
 Ming Tak Tong

 Ngau Tam Mei
 On Lung Tsuen
 Pak Shek Au
 Pok Wai
 Pun Uk Tsuen
 San Lung Tsuen
 San Tin San Wai
 Shek Wu Wai
 Sheung Chuk Yuen

 Sheung San Wai
 Tai Shang Wai
 Tsing Lung Tsuen
 Tung Chan Wai
 Wai Tsai Tsuen
 Wing Ping Tsuen
 Yan Shau Wai

Shap Pat Heung Rural Committee
十八鄉鄉事委員會

 Au Tau
 Choi Uk Tsuen
 Ha Yau Tin Tsuen
 Hung Tin Tsuen
 Hung Tso Tin Tsuen
 Kik Yeung Tsuen
 Kong Tau San Tsuen
 Kong Tau Tsuen
 Lung Tin Tsuen
 Ma Tin Tsuen
 Muk Kiu Tau Tsuen
 Nam Hang Tsuen
 Nam Pin Wai
 Nga Yiu Tau
 Pak Sha Tsuen

 Pak Sha Wo Liu
 Sai Pin Wai
 Shan Pui Tsuen
 Sham Chung Tsuen
 Sheung Yau Tin Tsuen
 Shui Tin Tsuen
 Shui Tsiu Lo Wai
 Shui Tsiu San Tsuen
 Shung Ching San Tsuen
 Sze Tsz Uk
 Tai Kei Leng
 Tai Kiu
 Tai Tong Tsuen
 Tai Wai Tsuen

 Tin Liu Tsuen
 Tong Tau Po Tsuen
 Tung Shing Lei
 Tung Tau Tsuen
 Wong Nai Tun Tsuen
 Wong Uk Tsuen
 Yeung Uk Tsuen
 Ying Lung Wai
 Yuen Long Kau Hui
 Chuk Hang
 Kwan Lok San Tsuen
 Small Traders New Village

Tuen Mun District

Tuen Mun Rural Committee
屯門鄉事委員會

Chung Uk Tsuen (2)

Tsuen Wan and Kwai Tsing District

Ma Wan Rural Committee
馬灣鄉事委員會

Chok Ko Wan and Pa Tau Kwu
Luk Keng

Tsing Yi Rural Committee

Note: The brackets are, (No. of Indigenous Inhabitant Representatives [原居民代表], No. of Resident Representatives [居民代表]) in the Tsing Yi Rural Committee. The villages with no bracketed numbers have no representatives in the committee.

Chung Mei Tsuen (3,1)
Lo Uk Tsuen (1,1)
Note: Chung Mei Tsuen and Lo Uk Tsuen are combined into one village called Chung Mei Lo Uk Tsuen. Tsing Yi residents prefer to call this village Chung Mei Tsuen.
Tai Wong Ha New Village or Tai Wong Ha Tsuen (5,1)
Sun Uk New Village or San Uk Tsuen (1,1)
Yim Tin Kok New Village or Yim Tin Kok Tsuen (1,1)
Lam Tin New Village or Lam Tin Tsuen (2,1)
Note: The above four villages were relocated together and are usually referred as Sai Tsuen, lit. four villages.
Fung Shue Wo New Village or Fung Shu Wo Tsuen (1,0)
Note: In Fung Shue Wo, there are two villages namely Tsing Yu New Village, and Tsing Yi Hui, lit. Tsing Yi Market.
Fishermen's Village and St. Paul's Village (0,1)
Tsing Yi Lutheran
Liu To
Ko Tan
Sai Shan Village

Tsuen Wan Rural Committee
荃灣鄉事委員會

Chuen Lung (3)
Chung Kwai Chung (3)
Kwan Mun Hau Tsuen

Islands District

Cheung Chau Rural Committee
長洲鄉事委員會

Lamma Island (North) Rural Committee
南丫島北段鄉事委員會

Ko Long
Lo Tik Wan
Pak Kok Kau Tsuen
Pak Kok San Tsuen
Sha Po
Tai Peng Tsuen
Tai Wan Kau Tsuen
Tai Yuen
Wang Long
Yung Shue Long
Yung Shue Wan

Lamma Island (South) Rural Committee
南丫島南段鄉事委員會

Lo So Shing
Luk Chau
Mo Tat
Mo Tat Wan
Po Toi
Sok Kwu Wan
Tung O
Yung Shue Ha

Mui Wo Rural Committee
梅窩鄉事委員會

Chung Hau (North)
Chung Hau (South)
Ha Tsuen Long
Luk Tei Tong
Man Kok Tsui
Ngau Kwu Long
Pak Mong
Pak Ngan Heung
Tai Ho
Tai Tei Tong
Wo Tin

Peng Chau Rural Committee
坪洲鄉事委員會

Nim Shu Wan
Tai Pak (not an existing village)

South Lantao Rural Committee
大嶼山南區鄉事委員會

Cheung Sha Lower Village
Cheung Sha Upper Village
Tong Fuk Village (塘福)

Tai O Rural Committee
大澳鄉事委員會

Fan Lau

Tung Chung Rural Committee
東涌鄉事委員會

Chek Lap Kok

Others
Former villages are italicised.

New Kowloon
Cha Kwo Ling Village
Fung Wong San Chuen
Grand View Village
Hau Wong Temple New Village
Ling Nam San Tsuen
Ma Chai Hang Tsuen
Man Kuk New Tsuen
Nga Tsin Wai Tsuen
Ngau Chi Wan Tsuen
Ping Ting Tsuen
Po Kong Tsuen
Pok Oi Tsuen
Pui Man Tsuen
Sam Ka Tsuen
Shanghai Tsuen
Sze Hai Tsuen
Tai Hom Village
Ha Yuen Leng and Sheung Yuen Leng (formerly Kowloon Yuen Leng)
Tai Hom Woi Tsuen
Tai Koon Yuen
Tong Ning New San Tsuen
Tung Shan Tsuen
Tung Wo Tsuen
Yan Oi San Tsuen
Yan Yee San Tsuen

Villages and former villages on Hong Kong Island and in Kowloon
Former villages are italicised.

Hong Kong Island
A Kung Ngam Village
Aldrich Village
 Big Wave Bay Village 
Ching Man Village
Fu Tau Wat VillageHealthy VillageHing Wah Village
 Hok Tsui VillageHoly Cross Path VillageKau Man VillageMa Shan VillageNan On Fong VillageO Pui Lung Shan Teng VillageO Pui Lung Village
Pok Fu Lam Tsuen
Shek O Village
Shek O New Village
Tai Ping VillageTsin Shui Ma Tau VillageWang Hang Tsai VillageWang Hang Tung Village
Wesley Village

KowloonTsim Sha Tsui VillageMa Tau Wai (馬頭圍, formerly 古瑾圍)

See also

 List of villages in China
 Walled villages of Hong Kong
 List of cities and towns in Hong Kong
 List of places in Hong Kong
List of buildings and structures in Hong Kong
 Heung Yee Kuk
 Rural committee
 Rural Representative elections

References

Further reading
Spollen, Jonathan. "Hong Kong's Forgotten Villages." The New York Times''. 19 January 2011.
Hill, R. D., Kathy Ng, and Tse Pui Wan. "The Suburbanization of Rural Villages in the New Territories, Hong Kong." (Working Paper No. 38) (Archive) University of Hong Kong Centre of Urban Studies & Urban Planning. April 1989.

External links

List of villages
List of Existing Village,Indigenous Village andComposite Indigenous Village, English
pdf format, html format by Google, Chinese (Traditional)
List of villages of Tai Po
General Location of Villages - Yuen Long District
List of rural committees
pdf format, html format by Google, English and Chinese (Traditional)
Other information
Villages in New Territories East
Villages in New Territories West
Villages in Lam Tsuen
Villages in Lung Yeuk Tau

 
Villages
Hong Kong
Hong Kong